Lakota sometimes appears as a surname. Notable people with the surname include: 

 Hryhoriy Lakota (1883–1950), Ukrainian bishop
 Peter Lakota (born 1937), Slovenian alpine skier

See also
 

Slovene-language surnames
Ukrainian-language surnames